The shore plover (Moriori: tchūriwat’, Thinornis novaeseelandiae), also known as the shore dotterel, is a small plover endemic to New Zealand. Once found all around the New Zealand coast, it is now restricted to a few offshore islands. It is one of the world's rarest shorebirds: the population is roughly 200.

Taxonomy 
The shore plover was formally described in 1789 by the German naturalist Johann Friedrich Gmelin in his revised and expanded edition of Carl Linnaeus's Systema Naturae. He placed it with the plovers in the genus Charadrius and coined the binomial name Charadrius novaeseelandiae. Gmelin based his description on the "New Zealand plover" that had been described and illustrated in 1785 by the English ornithologist John Latham in his A General Synopsis of Birds. The species had been collected near Queen Charlotte Sound. The species is now placed with the hooded dotterel in the genus Thinornis that was introduced in 1844 by the English zoologist George Robert Gray. The genus name combines the Ancient Greek this meaning "beach" or "sand" with ornis meaning "bird". The species is monotypic: no subspecies are recognised.

Thinornis rossii, supposedly from the Auckland Islands, is now generally considered to be a juvenile shore plover with an incorrectly recorded location. Some authorities consider the shore plover a species of Charadrius, and further genetic evidence will be needed to resolve the issue.

Description 

The shore plover is brown above and white below, with a black (male) or brown (female) mask. There is a distinctive white strip circling its head below its brown skullcap. Its legs and dark-tipped bill are orange, brighter in males.

Distribution 
Although this species was historically found only on the New Zealand coast, subfossil shore plover bones have been recovered from roosts of the extinct laughing owl near rivers many kilometres inland. Cook's second expedition collected them from opposite ends of the South Island, in Fiordland and the Marlborough Sounds. There are 19th century reports of shore plovers from the South Island and several parts of the North Island, but by the 1870s they had vanished from the mainland, surviving only on the Chatham Islands. Introduced predators such as feral cats and Norway rats were the main culprits.

Breeding 

Shore plovers (unusually for shorebirds) nest under cover (such as driftwood and vegetation) or in burrows under boulders. This is likely to be for protection against avian predators – in their current range, skuas, and past predators would have included the laughing owl and the New Zealand falcon. This is one of the reasons for their decline, as such nests are more vulnerable to mammalian predators.

In the early 1990s, the Department of Conservation (DOC) started a captive breeding programme at Pukaha / Mount Bruce National Wildlife Centre, and later at Isaac Conservation and Wildlife Trust. From a captive population of around 6–10 pairs, over 400 captive-bred juveniles have been released into the wild.

Conservation 
Shore plovers are endangered, with a world population of around 200 birds. The species survived on only one island, Rangatira, in the Chatham Islands, from where it has since been introduced to other offshore islands, such as Mangere Island in the Chathams, Mana Island near Wellington and Motutapu near Auckland. The world population was roughly 70 breeding pairs in 1937 and their habitat was declared a reserve in 1954. The population fluctuated in the 1980s, with only 40 breeding pairs in 1982, rising to 80 pairs in 1987 and a high of 94 pairs in 2010. A second wild population of about 20 birds was discovered in 1999 living on Western Reef off Chatham Island, but it gradually declined, and the last bird was taken into captivity in 2003. As of 2016, the wild population comprised 66 breeding pairs, 56 of them in the Chatham Islands. DOC has a stated goal of increasing the population to 250 in five different habitats.

DOC moved a number of captive-reared juveniles to Mana Island, off Wellington's western coast, between March and May 2007. They bred within months of their arrival, and in February 2008 twenty more were translocated. From a high of 87 individuals, the population was reduced to just 10 from the effects of a single Norway rat.

Birds had also been translocated since 2000 to Waikawa (Portland Island), a privately owned island off the Māhia Peninsula in Hawke's Bay. In 2012, the population on Waikawa was discovered to have crashed by 75% to just 20 birds, apparently due to predation by a Norway rat. Twelve eggs were rescued for translocation to Mana Island.

A total of 42 captive-bred shore plovers were released onto Motutapu Island in 2012 in the hope they would become established there and on other pest-free islands in the Hauraki Gulf. The birds repeatedly flew away, and only five were still present in 2015 when nineteen more were released. Motutapu had its mammalian pests removed in 2010, and the breeding population there increased from one pair in 2015 to three pairs in 2016. These birds are currently the most accessible to the public.

Six juveniles were released into the wild in 2018. Four additional juveniles were released in February 2019 with a further 21 due to be released on 25 March, having been bred at the Pūkaha National Wildlife Centre.  Five more juvenile birds were transported from a captive breeding program in Christchurch to Mana Island in April 2020 during the COVID19 lockdown.

References

Further reading

External links
BirdLife Species Factsheet.

Shore plover discussed on RadioNZ Critter of the Week, 29 April 2016
New Zealand Shore Plover, New Zealand Birds Online

Thinornis
Birds of the Chatham Islands
Birds described in 1789
Taxa named by Johann Friedrich Gmelin
Endangered biota of New Zealand
Endemic birds of New Zealand
Birds with names in Moriori